The Hotel Indonesia Kempinski Jakarta is one of the oldest and best known hotels in Jakarta, Indonesia. Located in Central Jakarta, it was one of the first 5-star hotels in South-East Asia and remains a major landmark of Jakarta. Its fame is often linked to the Indonesia's political pride. It is located by the famed Hotel Indonesia Roundabout, which gets its name from the hotel. It is adjacent to the Grand Indonesia and Plaza Indonesia shopping malls.

History
Occupying  of land, the Hotel Indonesia was designed by Danish architect, Abel Sorensen, and his wife, Wendy Becker. The hotel was constructed by Indonesia's first president, Sukarno, in preparation for the 1962 Asian Games. He wanted the hotel to showcase a modern Indonesia to the world.

The Hotel Indonesia opened for business on July 16, 1962, operated by Intercontinental Hotels, which ran the hotel until 1974. The grand opening was held on August 5, 1962, attended by President Sukarno. In front of the hotel, located in the heart of the capital, stands the Welcome Monument, intended to welcome guests visiting Jakarta for the Asian Games. Following the games, the hotel was used by President Sukarno to host state guests, and also official events.

During its heyday, Hotel Indonesia was the center of many cultural activities. Musical and theatrical performances were routinely staged at the hotel, which served as a launch pad for several renowned Indonesian stars, including Teguh Karya who was the hotel's stage manager, Slamet Rahardjo and Rima Melati. By the 1970s, the Nirwana Supper Club on the highest terrace of the Ramayana Wing was the venue of choice for Jakarta elites to enjoy a fancy dinner, complete with live entertainment by popular musician, local and international. The hotel was operated by Sheraton Hotels from 1977 to 1981 as the Hotel Indonesia Sheraton.

The Hotel Indonesia was declared a national cultural heritage site by Decree of the Governor of DKI Jakarta No. 475 on 29 March 1993. The decree commanded that the building and all of its historical assets should be well preserved and maintained.

In 2004, the government-owned hotel was closed for a complete renovation. It reopened on 20 May 2009 as the Hotel Indonesia Kempinski, managed by Kempinski Hotels, the oldest luxury hotel group in Europe.

Facilities
The hotel originally had 406 guestrooms. The number was reduced to 289 during the 2004 renovation. The hotel consists of two wings, the 16-story Ramayana Wing and the 8-story Ganesha Wing, including a Presidential Suite and four Diplomatic Suites. The Ramayana Wing features two types of guest rooms: Deluxe rooms (44 square metres) and Grand Deluxe rooms, which range in size from 58 to 62 square meters with total of 129 rooms.  The Ganesha Wing was designed for premium business travelers. It contains 160 rooms, consisting of 1 super-secured, bulletproof Presidential Suite, 4 Diplomatic Suites, 6 Salon Suites, 90 Executive Grand Deluxe, and 59 Deluxe rooms, complemented by a Lounge at the 7th floor.

The hotel originally boasted a large Olympic-size swimming pool in its backyard. In the 2004 renovation, it was replaced by a smaller swimming pool on the roof terrace. The Grand Indonesia shopping mall now stands on the site of the original pool.

The 3,000-square meter Kempinski Grand Ballroom, opened in March 2008, has held various corporate activities, exhibition wedding and events. The historical oval shaped 1,000-square meter Bali Room has been operating since September 2008.

External links
 Hotel Indonesia Kempinski Jakarta official website
  Saksi Bisu Penyimpan Sejarah dan Kenangan Bangsa
  Jangan Biarkan HI Tinggal Kenangan

References

Hotels in Jakarta
Hotel buildings completed in 1962
Hotels established in 1962
Central Jakarta
Kempinski Hotels